"(Kom så ska vi) Leva livet" is a song written by Per Gessle and Mats "MP" Persson, recorded by Gyllene Tider and released as a single on 29 April 1981.

It peaked at number 13 on the Swedish Singles Chart. The song also charted Svensktoppen for eight weeks between 31 May and 22 November 1981, peaking at second position.

Track listing

Side A
(Kom så ska vi) Leva livet - 3:41

Side B
Leka med elden - 4:51

Charts

References 

1981 singles
1981 songs
Gyllene Tider songs
Songs written by Per Gessle
Parlophone singles
Songs written by Mats Persson (musician)